Lori McNeil and Martina Navratilova were the defending champions but only McNeil competed that year. She competed with Rennae Stubbs but lost in the second round to Catherine Barclay and Kerry-Anne Guse.

Zina Garrison-Jackson and Larisa Neiland won in the final against Barclay and Guse, 6–4, 6–4.

Seeds
Champion seeds are indicated in bold text while text in italics indicates the round in which those seeds were eliminated. The top four seeded teams received byes into the second round.

Draw

Finals

Top half

Bottom half

External links
 1994 DFS Classic Draws
 ITF Tournament Page
 ITF doubles results page

Birmingham Classic (tennis)
1994 WTA Tour